Angheleşti may refer to several villages in Romania:

 Angheleşti, a village in Bucium, Alba
 Angheleşti, a village in Bucșani, Giurgiu
 Angheleşti, a village in Ruginești Commune, Vrancea County